Feng Liu is a Material Physicist.

Liu earned a bachelor's of science degree in materials science at Tsinghua University in 1984. He left Tsinghua in 1986 with a master's of science in solid state physics and obtained a doctorate in chemical physics at Virginia Commonwealth University in 1990. Liu then served as a postdoctoral researcher for four years, first with Rutgers University, before moving to the Oak Ridge National Laboratory. Between 1995 and 2000, he worked at the University of Wisconsin–Madison as a research scientist. Liu joined the University of Utah faculty in 2000 and was promoted to a full professorship in 2007. He was elected a fellow of the American Physical Society in 2011, "[f]or contributions to the theory of nanostructures and strain-induced nanoscale self-assembly". In May 2021, Liu was named the Ivan B. Cutler Professor of Materials Science and Engineering. Liu became a distinguished professor in July of the following year.

References

Place of birth missing (living people)
Chinese nanotechnologists
Year of birth missing (living people)
21st-century Chinese physicists
Fellows of the American Physical Society
Chinese expatriates in the United States
University of Utah faculty
Tsinghua University alumni
Virginia Commonwealth University alumni
University of Wisconsin–Madison staff
Living people